Apostolepis ambiniger, the Paraguayan blackhead, is a species of snake in the family Colubridae. It is found in Brazil, Bolivia, and Paraguay.

References 

ambiniger
Reptiles described in 1869
Reptiles of Brazil
Reptiles of Bolivia
Reptiles of Paraguay
Taxa named by Wilhelm Peters